Julien Odoul (born 8 May 1985) is a French politician and model.

Biography 
Julien Odoul was born in 1985 in Paris.

A model, he made the cover of the LGBT magazine Têtu when he was 21 years old, then three years later, was on the cover of the German gentleman's magazine Gab.

In politics, he joined the Socialist Party in order to support Prime Minister Laurent Fabius in 2006, then joined the Nouveau Centre in 2009.

He joins the Union of Democrats and Independents (UDI). Collaborator of the centrist deputy-mayor of Issy-les-Moulineaux, André Santini, he works for him until 2011. In 2012, he was a centrist candidate in the Val-de-Marne's 10th constituency.

In 2014, he joined the National Front. In 2017, Julien Odoul took over as head of the National Front Group in Bourgogne-Franche-Comté, then joined the party's national office in 2018. In 2019, he made comments during a council meeting along with a demand that a visitor take off her hijab. The visitor who was chaperoning a school trip was the mother to one of the children. Odoul's demand and remarks was rebuffed by council members with the council president, Marie-Guite Dufay, pointing out that neither French national law nor the regional council rules prohibited people from wearing veils during meetings.

References 

1985 births
Living people
National Rally (France) politicians
French male models
Politicians from Paris
Deputies of the 16th National Assembly of the French Fifth Republic